Naam Tamilar Katchi is a Tamil nationalist party in the Indian state of Tamil Nadu and the union territory of Puducherry. The party is known to revere Liberation Tigers of Tamil Eelam founder Velupillai Prabhakaran, whose image is prominently displayed at party events and gatherings. Originally founded in 1958, it was revived in 2010.

History

In 1958, Adithan founded the "We Tamils" (நாம் தமிழர் கட்சி) party with the platform of forming a sovereign Tamil state. It wanted the creation of a homogeneous Greater Tamil Nadu incorporating Tamil speaking areas of India and Sri Lanka. The party's headquarters was named as Tamiḻaṉ Illam (lit. The Home of the Tamilian). In 1960, the party organised statewide protests for the secession of Madras and the establishment of a sovereign Tamil Nadu. The protests were marked by the burning of maps of India (with Tamil Nadu left out). Adithanar was arrested for organising them. The party along with M. P. Sivagnanam's Tamil Arasu Kazhagam was also involved in the movement to change the name of the state from Madras State to Tamil Nadu. Adithan lost the 1962 election from Tiruchendur and was elected to the Legislative Council in 1964. The WT contested the 1967 election as an ally of the Dravida Munnetra Kazhagam (DMK) under the DMK's "Rising Sun" symbol. It elected four members to the Assembly, including Adithan, who won from Srivaikuntam. The party merged with the DMK in 1967. On 18 May 2010 in Madurai, a year after the military subjugation of the Eelam Tamils and the first anniversary of his  Naam Tamilar Iyakkam (We Tamils Movement), Seeman formed the party as a revival of S. P. Adithanar's Naam Tamilar (We Tamils).
Seeman, the NTK's chief co-ordinator, said that it would be an alternative political party different from the mainstream parties; the establishment of an independent Tamil Eelam would be the moral goal of not just the party, but of the Tamils in Tamil Nadu. During the rally, Seeman said: "We are not founding the Naam Tamilar party, we are continuing what S. P. Adithanar  founded."

Name and emblem
The party's name indicates that "We are Tamils", not labeled by caste or religion. It emphasizes Tamil rule of their homeland, opposing the Dravidian and Indian parties which have purportedly contributed to the downfall of the Tamils. The NTK flag is similar to the flag of Tamil Eelam; its tiger is also the emblem of the Cholas and the Tamil Tigers. The flag was introduced in Thanjavur, the historic Chola capital.

Policies

Water sharing and sand mining
The party has launched several demonstrations demanding Tamil Nadu's share of Kaveri River and Mullaperiyar Dam water from upstream states. Seeman has criticized political apathy on this issue and the illegal sand mining of the state's riverbeds.

NLC privatisation
In 2011-2012, when Tamil Nadu was in the midst of a power crisis which led to exorbitant tariffs and industrial failure, the management of Neyveli Lignite Corporation (a government-owned company in Neyveli) considered selling stock to private investors. This sparked unrest in the state, and NLC employees organized a strike against the central government's decision. The corporation was accused of manipulating its workers and covering up the issue.

Naam Tamilar Katchi opposed the decision, with Seeman saying that the Tamil strikers experienced discrimination from non-Tamil management. He also criticised the NLC for investing in other Indian states during an acute power shortage in Tamil Nadu.

Law and order
Seeman cited a deterioration in law and order in the state during the Congress-DMK alliance. Denying NTK involvement in an assault on a group of Lankan tourists in Chennai, he said that the party abhors violence in any form and cadres who violate its principles of conduct would be punished.

Refugees
Naam Tamilar Katchi has highlighted the plight of Sri Lankan Tamils who seek refuge in India, and their persecution by the state and central governments.

Abolition of the death penalty
NTK has supported commuting the death sentences and releasing those convicted in the Rajiv Gandhi case. Seeman has said that the party's stand was not limited to the three Tamils condemned to death, but for the abolition of the death penalty in India. Naam Tamilar Katchi has also called for the humanitarian release of prisoners jailed for more than 10 years. It supported closing the Eelam refugee special camps in Tamil Nadu, in which inmates were reportedly tortured.

Retrieval of Katchatheevu
Seeman says that Katchatheevu is an Indian island, and it was illegal to cede it to Sri Lanka. He promised to retrieve Kachatheevu by arming fishermen, which resulted in sedition charges.

Tamil rule in Tamil Nadu
Seeman said that the chief minister of Tamil Nadu should be a Tamil. According to a party slogan, everyone has right to live in Tamil Nadu but only a Tamil has the right to govern the state as chief minister. Seeman's statement was criticised as racist, and he was accused of identity politics and creating ethnic divisions. Tamil media asked, "Who is a Tamil? How do you define a Tamil?" His statement had a mixed reaction from Tamil nationalists.

Proposed Chennai–Salem Expressway
Naam Tamilar Katchi is against the proposed Chennai-Salem Expressway project. According to the party, the project would be a disaster for the region's fragile ecology and would enable mining companies to illegally mine valuable minerals in the Kalrayan and Servarayan Hills (on the expressway's proposed path). Seeman and his cadres, protesting the project's implementation, were arrested on 18 July 2018. The party also filed a writ petition in the Madras High Court, and the court quashed the government order to acquire land for the project.

Elections

2011 Tamil Nadu Assembly election
The NTK spearheaded a campaign against the Congress Party in the 2011 Tamil Nadu Legislative Assembly election for their alleged role in the genocide of Tamils in Sri Lanka and other anti-Tamil policies.

2016 Tamil Nadu Assembly election
Naam Tamilar Katchi contested in all 234 constituencies in Tamil Nadu and the districts of Puducherry and Karaikal. On 12 February 2016, all 234 NTK candidates were introduced in Cuddalore by Seeman. The party promotes equal rights, and has included candidates with disabilities. It is the first party in the history of Tamil Nadu with a transgender candidate. The Election Commission of India authorised twin candles as the party's symbol.

Seeman told a CPM member that his party would receive more votes than the CPM's PWF alliance in the 2016 state assembly elections, or he would dissolve his party and join the CPM. The NTK received fewer votes than the alliance, and fewer than NOTA. The NTK lost everywhere; Seeman finished in fifth place in Cuddalore, and lost his deposit. Asked by reporters about his challenge, Seeman said that he challenged the Communists (not the Vijayakanth-PWF alliance); his party received more votes than every single party in the PWF alliance, winning the challenge. The NTK received 458,104 votes (1.1 percent) in the 2016 Tamil Nadu Legislative Assembly election, more than older parties such as MDMK, CPI, VCK, CPM and TMC.

2017 R. K. Nagar by-election
The NTK fielded K. Kalaikottudhayam as its candidate for the 2017 R. K. Nagar by-election. According to Seeman, voters in Tamil Nadu pay more attention to party symbols than to the candidates. He said that the election commission should replace party symbols with candidate numbers or give every election new party symbols. Seeman criticized the commission for not attempting to halt the bribery of voters in the constituency, asking about the location of promised CCTV cameras. Tamil news channel Puthiya Thalaimurai TV surveyed the constituency on which participating party was an alternative to DMK and AIADMK. The results were NTK 11.72 percent, BJP 8.99 percent, DMDK 8.54 percent, CPI 5.45 percent, and no one 62.67 percent. The by-election was not held as planned on April 12, because the election rules were violated by bribery and corruption. Seeman expressed his dissatisfaction with democracy in India, saying that it was unfair of the Election Commission to stop the elections, rather than disqualifying the parties involved in bribery. The R. K. Nagar by-election was held on 21 December 2017, despite voter-bribery allegations. Independent candidate T. T. V. Dhinakaran won the election, and AIADMK and DMK took second and third place. NTK finished fourth, with 3,802 votes.

2019 Indian general election

Naam Tamilar Katchi contested all 39 Tamil Nadu constituencies and Puducherry. NTK was the first party to field 20 women in the 2019 Lok Sabha elections for the total of 40 seats (39 in Tamil Nadu and one in Puducherry).

The NTK received 84,855 votes for H. Mahendran in the Sriperumbudur constituency, the party's highest vote count in the 2019 Lok Sabha election. V. Jainteen received 17,069 votes in the Kanyakumari constituency, the party's lowest vote count in the state. NTK received a total of 1,645,185 votes, 3.909 percent of the 42,083,544 votes cast in the state.

2021 Tamil Nadu Assembly election
Naam Tamilar Katchi contested all 234 assembly constituencies in Tamil Nadu and 28 in Puducherry. The party again fielded equal numbers of male and female candidates (117 women and 117 men in Tamil Nadu). On 7 March 2021, Seeman introduced his party's candidates at a meeting in Chennai. Seeman would contest the Thiruvottiyur constituency, although he said earlier that he would contest the Kolathur constituency against DMK leader M. K. Stalin.

Electoral performance

References

2010 establishments in India
Political parties established in 2010
Political parties in Tamil Nadu
Regionalist parties in India
State political parties in Puducherry